Department of Territories may refer to:

 Department of Territories (1951–68), an Australian government department
 Department of Territories (1984–87), an Australian government department